is a Buddhist temple belonging to the Sōtō sect of Japanese Zen located in the town of Kōta, Nukata District, Aichi Prefecture, Japan. The temple is noted for its hydrangea flowers in spring. Its main image is a statue of Shaka Nyōrai.

History
Honkō-ji  was founded in 1573 by Matsudaira Tadasada, the founder of the Fukōzu-Matsudaira clan, and served as the bodaiji of the clan throughout the Edo period, even after the clan's transfer to Shimabara Domain in Kyushu in 1668. The temple claims without evidence that its statue of Shaka Nyōrai and the flanking statues of Jizo Bosatsu and Senju Kannon are works of the famed Kamakura period sculptor Unkei.

Fukōzu-Matsudaira Clan Cemetery
Honkō-ji's cemetery contains the graves of the chieftains of the Fukōzu-Matsudaira clan and was designated as a National Historic Site in 2014. 
 
The graveyard is divided into east and west sections. The western section has the graves of the first five generations and the 11th generation chieftains. The mortuary chapel of the 5th generation chieftain, Matsudaira Tadatoshi (1582-1632) is called the Shōkei-dō (肖影堂), and survives to the present day. The eastern section contains the graves of the 6th through 10th and 12th through 19th generation chieftains. In August 2008, during the heavy rain, the tombstone of the 7th generation Matsudaira Tadao (1673-1736) collapsed, and when restoration were carried out and number of grave goods were recovered, including a tachi Japanese sword and some glass objects, including a Bohemian crystal cup dated around 1599.

Gallery

See also
List of Historic Sites of Japan (Aichi)

References

External links

Kōta Town tourist information 
Kota Town home page 

Buddhist temples in Aichi Prefecture
Fukōzu-Matsudaira clan
Soto Zen
Mikawa Province
Historic Sites of Japan
Kōta, Aichi